KZHS (590 AM) was a radio station broadcasting a Sports Talk format. Formerly licensed to Hot Springs, Arkansas, United States, it served the Hot Springs area. It had a daytime broadcast radius of roughly 300 miles. Prior to being a sports station, it was known as Spanish-language KZPA until November 2008. The station was owned by Noalmark Broadcasting Corporation.

Noalmark surrendered the license for KZHS to the Federal Communications Commission (FCC) on February 7, 2014, who subsequently cancelled it.

External links

Sports radio stations in the United States
ZHS
Radio stations established in 1951
Defunct radio stations in the United States
Radio stations disestablished in 2014
Noalmark Broadcasting Corporation radio stations
1951 establishments in Arkansas
2014 disestablishments in Arkansas
ZHS
Hot Springs, Arkansas